Edward H. Hoerster (born October 12, 1941) was a Canadian football player who played for the Hamilton Tiger-Cats, Toronto Argonauts, and Saskatchewan Roughriders. He won the Grey Cup with the Tiger-Cats in 1965. Ed Hoerster retired with his wife Judy, his 4 children, and 8 grandchildren. He played college football at the University of Notre Dame and was selected by the Chicago Bears in the 1963 NFL draft (Round 6, #137). Hoerster now plays golf in his free time.

References

1941 births
Notre Dame Fighting Irish football players
Hamilton Tiger-Cats players
Toronto Argonauts players
Saskatchewan Roughriders players
Players of American football from Chicago
Players of Canadian football from Chicago
Living people